The 1935 Washburn Ichabods football team represented Washburn University during the 1935 college football season. Washburn played their home games at the Moore Bowl in Topeka, Kansas. In their ninth and final year under head coach Ernest Bearg, the Ichabods compiled a 4–6 record and were 1–2 in their first season as members of the Missouri Valley Conference.

Schedule

References

Washburn
Washburn Ichabods football seasons
Washburn Ichabods football